Rock Creek Township may refer to:

Arkansas
 Rock Creek Township, Searcy County, Arkansas

Illinois
 Rock Creek Township, Hancock County, Illinois

Indiana
 Rock Creek Township, Bartholomew County, Indiana
 Rock Creek Township, Carroll County, Indiana
 Rock Creek Township, Huntington County, Indiana
 Rockcreek Township, Wells County, Indiana

Iowa
 Rock Creek Township, Jasper County, Iowa

Kansas
 Rock Creek Township, Butler County, Kansas
 Rock Creek Township, Coffey County, Kansas
 Rock Creek Township, Cowley County, Kansas
 Rock Creek Township, Jefferson County, Kansas
 Rock Creek Township, Nemaha County, Kansas, in Nemaha County, Kansas
 Rock Creek Township, Pottawatomie County, Kansas, in Pottawatomie County, Kansas
 Rock Creek Township, Wabaunsee County, Kansas, in Wabaunsee County, Kansas

Nebraska
 Rock Creek Township, Saunders County, Nebraska

North Carolina
 Rock Creek Township, Guilford County, North Carolina, in Guilford County, North Carolina
 Rock Creek Township, Wilkes County, North Carolina, in Wilkes County, North Carolina

South Dakota
 Rock Creek Township, Miner County, South Dakota, in Miner County, South Dakota

Township name disambiguation pages